Jonathan Blakeson is an English film director and screenwriter. His first feature film was The Disappearance of Alice Creed (2009), a thriller starring Gemma Arterton, Martin Compston, and Eddie Marsan, which he wrote and directed. His most recent film was I Care a Lot (2020).

Early life
Blakeson was born and raised in Harrogate, North Yorkshire. He attended and graduated from the University of Warwick, where he studied Film and Literature. Outside studying, he oversaw the writing and direction of two low-budget short films, Struggling (1997) and Red Tape (1998).

Career
Blakeson directed The 5th Wave, based on the novel of the same name by Rick Yancey. Chloë Grace Moretz played Cassie, and Susannah Grant wrote the screenplay. The movie made over $109 million at the global box office. Blakeson directed the miniseries Gunpowder starring Kit Harington, Liv Tyler, Mark Gatiss, Peter Mullan and Shaun Dooley. Gunpowder was shown on BBC One in the UK and on HBO in the U.S. Blakeson's next feature film was I Care a Lot, which was released on Netflix in 2021 and featured a Golden Globe Award-winning lead performance from Rosamund Pike.

Blakeson will write and direct Culprits, a crime thriller series for Disney+.

Filmography
Short film

Feature film

Television

References

External links

Living people
Alumni of the University of Warwick
People from Harrogate
English film directors
English screenwriters
English male screenwriters
Year of birth missing (living people)
21st-century English male writers